Gladys del Estal Ferreño was a ecologist activist from San Sebastián, Gipuzkoa, Spain (Caracas, 1956 - Tudela, 1979). She was killed by a bullet shot at her by the Guardia Civil during a protest in Tudela, Navarre, against the nuclear station construction program for the Basque Country, and the aircraft firing range of Bardenas. She has since become an important icon of the ecologist movement.

Biography 
Gladys del Estal Ferreño was born in Venezuela to Spanish parents exiled during the Spanish Civil War (1936-1939). Her father was Enrique del Estal Añorga and her mother Eugenia Ferreño. The family returned home, settling down in Egia, San Sebastian. She studied at Colegio Presentación de María, and later Administration at the Centro Cultural Femenino Nazaret. She also had finished her studies at the Faculty of Computer Science at the University of the Basque Country in 1978, and worked as a programmer in a small computers company.

Death 

The anti-nuclear movement called a protest on 3 June 1979 at Tudela, converging with another against the Bardenas aircraft firing range. The Civil Guard took positions in Tudela and charged against the 4,000 marchers who turned out at the peaceful demonstration. As marchers fled, a number of them decided to sit down at the bridge against repression, with Gladys among them. A Civil Guard squad approach them, with one of them brandishing an automatic rifle, who shot at the back of the head of the young activist, causing her immediate death.

The author of the shot was judged, receiving a sentence of 18 months imprisonment in December 1981 for "reckless endangerment", since the tribunal in Pamplona deemed his action was 'unintended'. Just the opposite, fellow ecologist activists who prefer to remain anonymous state that the officer José Martínez Salas would direct an obscene comment at her, for which she insulted him. The officer retorted by shooting at her.

The Civil Guard officer responsible for the murder does not appear to have set foot in prison. Ten years later, he was decorated for his "impeccable behaviour" in Tudela, where Gladys del Estal was killed. Under Spanish premier Felipe González, the shooter was awarded the Cross of Military Merit.

Memory 

A memorial was erected in remembrance of Gladys del Estal at the site where she was killed one year on; it read Gladys gogoan zaitugu (Basque for "Gladys we hold you in our memory"); still it was removed by the Civil Guard. A demonstration was held where protesters chanted slogans against the power company Iberduero and the police forces, at a time of intense violent activity pursued by ETA, police forces acting beyond official missions, and paramilitary groups. The organizers planted a Basque flag with a black ribbon. The governmental authority reported the organizers for not sticking to the schedule and showing "punishable slogans and attitudes".

She has a memorial in the Cristina Enea Park in Donostia (San Sebastián). 38 on after her death a tribute was staged at the site of her memorial. A footbridge in the city also bears her name.

See also 
 Lemóniz Nuclear Power Plant
 Three Mile Island accident
 Basque conflict
 Spanish transition

Notes

References 

Spanish ecologists
People murdered in Spain
1979 deaths
Spanish women computer scientists
1956 births